The Eclipse-class cruisers were a class of nine second-class protected cruisers constructed for the Royal Navy in the mid-1890s.

Design and description

These ships were enlarged and improved versions of the preceding . They displaced  at normal load. To reduce biofouling, the hulls of the ships were sheathed with wood and copper. Their crew consisted of 450 officers and enlisted men.

The ships carried five 40-calibre  quick-firing (QF) guns in single mounts protected by gun shields. One gun was mounted on the forecastle, two on the quarterdeck and one pair was abreast the bridge. The secondary armament consisted of six 40-calibre  guns; three on each broadside.

Defense against torpedo boats was provided by eight QF 12-pounder 12 cwt guns and six  three-pounder Hotchkiss guns. Four of the 12-pounders were mounted in the sides of the hull fore and aft while the remaining four guns were interspersed between the 4.7-inch guns. The three-pounders were mounted in the fighting tops, three in each one. The ships also equipped with three 18-inch torpedo tubes, one submerged tube on each broadside and one above water in the stern. The ammunition supply consisted of 200 six-inch rounds per gun, 250 shells for each 4.7-inch gun, 300 rounds per gun for the 12-pounders and 500 for each three-pounder. Each ship also carried ten torpedoes, presumably four for each broadside tube and two for the stern tube.

Between 1903 and 1905, all of the ships in the class except for Eclipse had their mixed armament replaced with a more uniform armament of eleven 6-inch, nine 12-pounders and seven 3-pounder guns.

The primary protection of the Eclipse class was its sloping armoured deck. The engines were protected by a six-inch armoured hatch that extended above the armoured deck. The gun shields for the six-inch guns were three inches thick and the conning tower's armour was six inches thick.

Ships

Notes

Footnotes

References

External links

Eclipse Class Second Class Protected Cruisers on World War 1 Naval Combat
Eclipse Class on Battleships & Cruisers

 
Cruiser classes
Ship classes of the Royal Navy